John Corder may refer to:
 John A. Corder, United States Air Force general
 John Shewell Corder, English architect and artist